Zeng Siqi is a Chinese artistic gymnast. She is a member of the Chinese National team and represents the Hunan province. She's coached by former World Champion and Olympic silver medalist Ling Jie. Her best events are balance beam and floor exercise.

Junior career 
Zeng was named to the Chinese team for the 2010 Pacific Rim Championships, where she won a team silver medal and a bronze medal on uneven bars in the junior division. At the Chinese Nationals, she won bronze on balance beam and placed fourth on floor exercise.

The following year, she placed third in the all-around at both the National Championships and the Sakura Cup.

Senior career 
Zeng made her senior debut at the Chinese Nationals, where she won floor exercise and placed second on balance beam.
She competed at the Doha Cup in early 2013 and won silver on balance beam and bronze on floor exercise. In May she placed third at the Chinese National Championships. Zeng was selected as a member of the Chinese team for the World Championships in Antwerp, Belgium. She competed on balance beam in the qualifications round but unfortunately she did not make the final due to a fall on one of her elements.

References

External links
Zeng Siqi at Fédération Internationale de Gymnastique

1996 births
Chinese female artistic gymnasts
Living people
People from Xiangtan
Gymnasts from Hunan